The Complex of Mehmed I, aka Yeşil Complex, is a large Ottoman complex of religious buildings in Bursa, Turkey built by Sultan Mehmed I Çelebi and completed in 1420.

The complex
The complex is one of the last in a series of royal mosque complexes in Bursa starting with the Orhaniye Complex in the 14th century and ending with the Muradiye Complex completed in 1447. The complex includes the Yeşil Mosque, a madrasah, bath house, soup kitchen, and Yeşil Türbe (the tomb of Mehmed I Çelebi).

See also
 Ali Tabrizi
 Muradiye Complex
 Yeşil Mosque
 Gülruh Hatun
 Şirin Hatun
 Bülbül Hatun

External links
 Images of the Complex of Mehmed I

References
 
 Archnet Digital Library, Dictionary of Islamic Architecture, Yeşil Cami.

Religious buildings and structures completed in 1420
Mosques in Bursa
Ottoman mosques in Bursa